Hélène-Frédérique de Faye-Jozin (22 February 1871 – 30 January 1942) was a French composer. She was born in Saint Brieuc and died in Côtes-d'Armor.

Works
Selected works include:
1906 Cantilène, Opus 30, duo
1922 Suite Sylvestre, suite
1925 Mirage, duo				
1931 Solo de Concert, cello concerto	
1934 Contre une vielle, canon	
1936 Cyprès, Fontaines et Lauriers, duo

References

1871 births
1942 deaths
19th-century classical composers
20th-century classical composers
French music educators
19th-century French composers
20th-century French women musicians
20th-century French composers
Women music educators
French classical composers
French women classical composers
20th-century women composers
19th-century women composers